Poropuntius consternans is a species of ray-finned fish in the genus Poropuntius which is endemic to the eastern half of the Bolovens Plateau in southern Laos. Its numbers are thought to be decreasing due to heavy fishing pressure, but the biggest threat to this species are the planned dams, Xe, Pian-Xe and Namnoy, which are to be built within the next few years and which are likely to have a significant impact on this species. In addition, there is continuing decline in the quality as the surrounding land is converted to agriculture. The IUCN assess Poropuntius consternans as Endangered.

It is one of four Poropuntius species endemic to the Bolovens Plateau, three of which were treated as trophic morphs of P. bolovenensis by Tyson R. Roberts but more recently Maurice Kottelat has determined that these are separate species, as the specialisation is present in juveniles which mean it is genetically determined, Kottelat also described a fourth species. P. consternans is Roberts'  acuticeps morph.

References 

consternans
Fish described in 2000